Lite Me Up is a pop album with a strong disco-funk feel by Herbie Hancock. It was Hancock's first release without producer David Rubinson since 1969. On this album, Hancock was influenced by his long-time friend, producer Quincy Jones and sessions included many musicians associated with Jones including Steve Lukather and Jeff Porcaro of Toto. The album was the first on which Hancock played the Synclavier, a digital polyphonic synthesizer.

Track listing
"Lite Me Up!" (Rod Temperton)
"The Bomb" (Herbie Hancock, Temperton)
"Gettin' to the Good Part" (Hancock, Temperton)
"Paradise" (Bill Champlin, David Foster, Jay Graydon, Hancock)
"Can't Hide Your Love" (Jeffrey Cohen, Hancock, Narada Michael Walden)
"The Fun Tracks" (Temperton)
"Motor Mouth" (Temperton)
"Give It All Your Heart" (Hancock, Temperton)

Personnel
Herbie Hancock - clavinet, keyboards, Minimoog, piano, synthesizer, synthesizer drums, vocals, vocoder
Jerry Hey - flugelhorn, trumpet
Gary Herbig - saxophone, woodwind
Chuck Findley - trombone, trumpet
William Frank "Bill" Reichenbach, Jr. - trombone
Michael Boddicker, Corrado Rustici, Frank Martin - synthesizer
Steve Lukather, David Williams, Jay Graydon - guitar
Louis Johnson, Randy Jackson, Abraham Laboriel, Sr. - bass
Narada Michael Walden, Jeff Porcaro, John "J.R." Robinson - drums
Paulinho da Costa - percussion
Wayne Anthony - lead vocals (2, 6 & 7), Patrice Rushen - vocals, vocoder (8)  
Patti Austin, Paulette Williams, Jim Gilstrap, Venette Gloud, Linda Lawrence, John Lehman, Richard Page - backing vocals
David Foster - piano

References

1982 albums
Columbia Records albums
Albums produced by Narada Michael Walden
Herbie Hancock albums